A Cow at My Table is a 1998 documentary film examining Western attitudes towards farm animals and meat.

It covers the conflict between animal rights advocates and the meat industry, and their respective attempts to influence consumers. It was directed, shot, and edited by Jennifer Abbott, who spent five years travelling across Canada, the United States, Australia and New Zealand to interview representatives on all sides. The film intercuts these interviews with images of farm animals and industrial farming operations. It explores what is sometimes popularly called factory farming.

The filming of A Cow at My Table drew early criticism from the Canadian meat industry, with both the Ontario Chicken Marketing Board and the Dairy Farmers of Ontario publishing articles warning of Abbott's actions.

Music for the film was performed by Oh Susanna.

See also
 List of vegan media

References

External links
 
A Cow at My Table on Google Video

1998 films
Canadian documentary films
Films about cattle
Documentary films about agriculture
Documentary films about animal rights
Intensive farming
1998 documentary films
Films directed by Jennifer Abbott
1990s English-language films
1990s Canadian films